McKenzie Electric Cooperative, Inc. (MEC) is a rural electric cooperative based in Watford City, North Dakota. It services portions of McKenzie, Dunn, Billings, Golden Valley and Mercer Counties in North Dakota and Richland and Wibaux Counties in Montana. MEC is a member of the North Dakota Association of Rural Electric Cooperatives.

External links
McKenzie Electric Cooperative website

Electric cooperatives in North Dakota
Electric power companies of the United States
Companies based in North Dakota